The Marshfield Elks Temple, also known as B.P.O.E. Lodge No. 1160, is a two-story Georgian Revival building in Coos Bay, Oregon that was built during 1919–20.  It was listed on the National Register of Historic Places in 1983.

It was designed by architect William G. Chandler (1884-1959).  In 1982, it was being renovated to serve as the headquarters of the Security Bank of Coos County.

Chandler also designed the NRHP-listed J. S. Coke Building, nearby at 150 Central Ave. in Coos Bay.

References

Clubhouses on the National Register of Historic Places in Oregon
Georgian Revival architecture in Oregon
Cultural infrastructure completed in 1919
Elks buildings
Coos Bay, Oregon
Buildings and structures in Coos County, Oregon
National Register of Historic Places in Coos County, Oregon
1919 establishments in Oregon